Uninett AS is a state-owned company responsible for Norway's National Research and Education Network. The organization develops and operates the national research network in Norway. The center of operations in located at Teknobyen Innovation Centre in Trondheim. Uninett has approximately 100 employees. All Norwegian universities and most of the public colleges are connected to Uninett. Any non-commercial research or educational institution such as libraries, archives and schools may be connected for a yearly fee. The CEO of Uninett is Tom Røtting.

History 
Uninett was established in 1976 as a project based on funding from the Royal Norwegian Council for Scientific and Industrial Research, and was headquartered at SINTEF in Trondheim. The work was continued as a research project in SINTEF, before Uninett was established as an operating organization for the academic data network in Norway. Uninett has been responsible for the administration of the .no domain on the internet ever since it was established as the top-level domain in 1987. After five years as a project organization, the joint-stock company Uninett AS was founded in 1993.

In 1999, parts of Uninett's operations were separated as a separate company, Uninett FAS (Joint Administrative Systems). FAS was to develop technical solutions for efficient operation of administrative services for the higher education sector. In 2002 and 2003, two more subsidiaries were established, Uninett ABC and Uninett Norid. ABC was to use Uninett's competence and experience for web development for the other educational institutions in Norway, with emphasis on primary and secondary schools. Norid was to continue the administration of domain names under the .no domain. The subsidiary Uninett Sigma, was established in 2004. Sigma has later changed its name to Uninett Sigma2, and coordinates heavy computing and storage in the higher education sector. 

Following a request from the Ministry of Education and Research to pool the state resources within ICT in basic education, Uninett ABC was separated from the group at the turn of the year 2009/2010. 

Uninett FAS was wound up as a separate company on 31 December 2011.

References

External links
 Website 

Companies based in Trondheim
Internet service providers of Norway
Government-owned companies of Norway
Government research
Mass media companies established in 1976
National research and education networks
1976 establishments in Norway